Ja'Juan Seider (born April 16, 1977), is an American football coach and former player. He is currently the running backs coach for Penn State. He played college football for the West Virginia Mountaineers and the Florida A&M Rattlers.  He was selected in the sixth round of the 2000 NFL Draft by the San Diego Chargers.

Early life
A native of Belle Glade, Florida, Seider was an All-District quarterback at Glades Central High School.  After his senior season, Seider would accept a scholarship to play college football at West Virginia University.

College playing career
After spending four years as a backup quarterback at West Virginia University, Seider transferred to Florida A&M for his senior season to play for head coach Billy Joe.

Coaching career

Early coaching career
Seider's first coaching job would be at his high school alma mater, Glades Central High School coaching running backs in 2001 and 2002. He would spend the next two seasons as offensive coordinator at Palm Beach Lakes High. The following two seasons he would spend at Lake Worth Community High School coaching quarterbacks.  Seider would join Bill Stewart’s Mountaineer staff as a graduate assistant in 2008 and 2009.

Marshall
Marshall’s Doc Holliday hired him away to serve as running backs coach and recruiting coordinator from 2010 to 2012.

West Virginia
In 2013, Seider was hired by head coach Dana Holgorsen as the running backs coach for the West Virginia Mountaineers.  Seider would spend four seasons with the Mountaineers, and would produce 1,000-yard rushers three of the four years. Charles Sims amassed 1,095 yards and 11 touchdowns on the ground in 2013, and the Tampa Bay Buccaneers selected him 69th overall in the third round of the 2014 NFL Draft. Wendell Smallwood followed suit in 2015, recording 1,519 yards (tops in the Big 12) and nine touchdowns and was selected 150th overall in the fifth round of the 2016 NFL Draft by the Philadelphia Eagles.  In 2016, Justin Crawford led West Virginia in the rushing with 1,184 yards, good for third in the Big 12.

Florida
In 2017, Seider was hired by the Florida Gators and head coach Jim McElwain as the running backs coach.  Seider would only spend one season at Florida after McElwain was fired and replaced by Dan Mullen.  Seider was retained by Coach Mullen to coach tight ends, but chose to weigh other coaching options.

Penn State
On January 25, 2018, Penn State head coach James Franklin announced Ja'Juan Seider as the Nittany Lions’ running backs coach. The Nittany Lions rushed for 204.9 yards per game.  This was the highest per game total since 2008, when Penn State rushed for 205.8.  Sanders, who rushed for 1,274 yards and nine touchdowns, was selected in the second round (53rd overall) by the Philadelphia Eagles in 2019 NFL Draft.

References

External links
Penn State Profile
Marshall Profile

1977 births
Living people
People from Belle Glade, Florida
Sportspeople from the Miami metropolitan area
Players of American football from Florida
West Virginia Mountaineers football players
Florida A&M Rattlers football players
Coaches of American football from Florida
High school football coaches in Florida
West Virginia Mountaineers football coaches
Marshall Thundering Herd football coaches
Florida Gators football coaches
Penn State Nittany Lions football coaches